Ferrere is a comune (municipality) in the Province of Asti in the Italian region Piedmont, located about  southeast of Turin and about  west of Asti.

Ferrere borders the following municipalities: Cantarana, Cisterna d'Asti, Montà, San Damiano d'Asti, and Valfenera.

Demographic evolution

Twin towns — sister cities
Ferrere is twinned with:

  La Francia, Argentina (1998)
  Predazzo, Italy (2005)

References

–

Cities and towns in Piedmont